The Industrial Input/Output Framework (IIO Framework) is a part of the Linux kernel.

References

External links 

 The Linux driver implementer’s API guide, Industrial I/O

Linux kernel features